The 2012 Pacific Nations Cup rugby union tournament was held between the four national sides on the Pacific Rim: Fiji, Japan, Samoa and Tonga.

Japan were the reigning champion after they defeated Fiji in the 2011 competition at Churchill Park, Lautoka.  The tournament ran from 5 to 23 June 2012 with most of the matches hosted by Japan.  Only the match between Tonga and Fiji was played at Churchill Park in Fiji.

The tournament was a round-robin where each team plays all of the other teams once.  There were four points for a win, two for a draw and none for a defeat.  There were also bonus points offered with one bonus point for scoring four or more tries in a match and one bonus point for losing by 7 points or less.

Samoa emerged as champions.

Table

Schedule

Round 1

Round 2

Round 3

Statistics

Point scorers

<small>Source: irb.com

Try scorers

<small>Source: irb.com

See also 

2012 IRB Nations Cup

References

External links 
 IRB Pacific Nations Cup – from the IRB website (accessed 1 May 2012)

2012
2012 rugby union tournaments for national teams
2012 in Oceanian rugby union
2012 in Fijian rugby union
2011–12 in Japanese rugby union
2012 in Samoan rugby union
2012 in Tongan rugby union